Sinpunctiptilia tasmaniae is a moth of the family Pterophoridae. It is found in Tasmania.

Sinpunctiptilia tasmaniae was separated from Sinpunctiptilia emissalis by Ernst Arenberger in 2006.

External links
Trin Wiki

Moths of Australia
Platyptiliini
Moths described in 2006